Tumar Kandi (also Romanized as Tūmār Kandī; also known as Qeshlāq-e Tūmār Şādeq and Tūmār) is a village in Qeshlaq-e Jonubi Rural District, Qeshlaq Dasht District, Bileh Savar County, Ardabil Province, Iran. At the 2006 census, its population was 114, in 20 families.

References 

Tageo

Populated places in Bileh Savar County
Towns and villages in Bileh Savar County